John Gaunt may refer to:

 John C. Gaunt (1833–1886), American soldier in the American Civil War
 John L. Gaunt (1924–2007), American Pulitzer Prize-winning photographer
 John Gaunt, dean of the University of Kansas School of Architecture, Design, and Planning, 1994–2015
 John Gaunt, the alter ego of the comic book mercenary Grimjack

See also
 Jon Gaunt (born 1961), English radio talk show presenter
 John O'Gaunt (disambiguation)
 John of Gaunt, 1st Duke of Lancaster